Butternut Run is a tributary of Bowman Creek in Luzerne County, Pennsylvania, in the United States. The surficial geology along the stream consists of Wisconsinan Till. Its drainage basin is designated as a High-Quality Coldwater Fishery and a Migratory Fishery and the stream is Class A Wild Trout Waters.

Course
Butternut Run begins at the head of a valley on Kocher Mountain in Lake Township. It flows north through the valley for several tenths of a mile, receiving two short, unnamed tributaries (one from the left and one from the right). The stream then turns northwest for several tenths of a mile before turning north for several hundred feet. After this, it turns northeast, leaving its valley. A short distance further downstream, it reaches its confluence with Bowman Creek.

Hydrology

Geography and geology

The surficial geology along the length of Butternut Run features a till known as Wisconsinan Till. In the streams lower reaches, this is underlain by glacial lake clays. The stream's valley walls and the area surrounding the valley has surficial geology featuring bedrock consisting of sandstone and shale.

Watershed
The stream is entirely within the United States Geological Survey quadrangle of Sweet Valley. Its mouth is located near Mountain Springs.

The entire length of Butternut Run is on private land that is closed to access.

History
Butternut Run was entered into the Geographic Names Information System on August 2, 1979. Its identifier in the Geographic Names Information System is 1170818.

Biology
The drainage basin of Butternut Run is designated as a High-Quality Coldwater Fishery and a Migratory Fishery. Wild trout naturally reproduce in the stream from its headwaters downstream to its mouth. It is classified by the Pennsylvania Fish and Boat Commission as Class A Wild Trout Waters for brook trout from its headwaters downstream to its mouth.

See also
Cider Run (Bowman Creek), next tributary of Bowman Creek going downstream
Beth Run, next tributary of Bowman Creek going upstream
List of rivers of Pennsylvania
List of tributaries of Bowman Creek

References

Rivers of Luzerne County, Pennsylvania
Tributaries of Bowman Creek
Rivers of Pennsylvania